Robert Herbert Ayres (11 January 1914 – July 1993) was an English professional rugby league footballer who played in the 1930s and 1940s.

Background
Bob Ayres was born in Barrow-in-Furness, Lancashire, England, and he died aged 79 in Lancashire.

Playing career

International honours
Bob Ayres represented British Empire while at Barrow in 1937 against France, and won caps for England while at Barrow in 1938 against Wales, and France, and in 1945 against Wales.

County honours
Bob Ayres won cap(s) for Lancashire while at Barrow.

Challenge Cup Final appearances
Bob Ayres played right-, i.e. number 12, in Barrow's 4–7 defeat by Salford in the 1938 Challenge Cup Ffondon on Saturday 7 May 1938.

County Cup Final appearances
Bob Ayres played right-, i.e. number 12, in Barrow's 4–8 defeat by Warrington in the 1937 Lancashire County Cup Final during the 1937–38 season at Central Park, Wigan on Saturday 23 October 1937.

Testimonial match
Bob Ayres' Testimonial matches at Barrow were shared with Val Cumberbatch, John Higgin, William Little and Dan McKeating, and took place against Swinton on Saturday 27 April 1946, and against Oldham on Saturday 27 January 1947.

Contemporaneous article extract
"The man who always comes up smiling, Club captain during the war years. A product of local football, signed in 1933. International and County player."

References

1914 births
1993 deaths
Barrow Raiders players
British Empire rugby league team players
England national rugby league team players
English rugby league players
Lancashire rugby league team players
Rugby league players from Barrow-in-Furness
Rugby league props
Rugby league second-rows